Barclay Bay is a bay in King Christian IX Land, Eastern Greenland. The area of the bay is uninhabited. Administratively Barclay Bay and its surroundings belong to the Sermersooq municipality.

Geography
Barclay Bay lies in the Blosseville Coast south of Knighton Fjord. Its mouth lies between Cape Barclay to the northeast and Cape Ryder to the southwest. Høst Havn is a small, protected inlet located close to the northern side of the mouth

References

External links
Changes in the marine-terminating glaciers of central east Greenland

Bays of Greenland